The 1941 Wellington City mayoral election was part of the New Zealand local elections held that same year. In 1941, elections were held for the Mayor of Wellington and fifteen city councillors plus seats on the Wellington Hospital Board and Wellington Harbour Board. The polling was conducted using the standard first-past-the-post electoral method.

Background
While residents as well as ratepayers had been able to vote in local elections since 1910, in this election tenants of state houses throughout New Zealand were made borough electors as though they were ratepayers (though they did not pay rates directly to councils, which were paid by central government). This meant that there was no qualifying period of residence for them, though they did not acquire the ratepayers' right to vote on loan or rating proposals.

The 'Nathan Incident'
The election resulted in a landslide victory for the right-leaning local ticket the Citizens' Association with their candidates capturing all council seats and the mayoralty, blitzing the Labour Party. This resulted from a scandal involving Hubert Nathan, a Citizens candidate for the Wellington Harbour Board and a stockbroker. Like other Citizens candidates, he had been critical of the number of union secretaries on the Labour ticket, asking how they could serve ratepayers and the city while dependent on the unions for their jobs. Nathan agreed to a visit on Friday 9 May by a union official and an associate, but that afternoon five men called and used "Gestapo tactics" according to Nathan. They reviling him because he was a Jew and saying no Jew should hold any public position, as well as saying they would stop him travelling or getting deliveries unless he apologised and withdrew in writing. On Wednesday 14 May after four days his account was splashed over the papers, giving the unions little time to respond. The Labour Representation Committee said his accusations were "hardly credible" but newspaper editorials condemned the use of union power to victimise opponents. No Labour candidate was returned to any of the three authorities, though McKeen (as highest polling unsuccessful candidate) was appointed to the Council in 1942 to fill a vacancy caused by Len McKenzie's death.

It was nine years before a Labour candidate was again elected to the Council. The Citizens' clean sweep included Elizabeth Gilmer an active conservationist and daughter of Richard Seddon. Labour also lost all seats on the Wellington Hospital Board, although the board still had Labour representatives from Mākara, Petone and Johnsonville.

Mayoralty results

Councillor results

 
 
 
 
 
 
 
 
 
 
 
 
  
 
 
 
 
 
 
 
 

 
 
 
 
 
 
 
 
 
 
 
 
 
 
 
  

Table footnotes:
<noinclude>

Notes

References

Mayoral elections in Wellington
 Wellington City mayoral election
Politics of the Wellington Region
1940s in Wellington